Office of Chief of Military Security Affairs (OCMSA) စစ်ဘက်ရေးရာ လုံခြုံရေးအရာရှိချုပ်ရုံး (စရခ), commonly referred to by its Burmese acronym Sa Ya Pa (Sa Aa Pa in S'gaw Karen), is a branch of the Myanmar armed forces tasked with intelligence gathering. It was created to replace the Directorate of Defence Services Intelligence (DDSI), which was disbanded in 2004.

OCMSA is charged with handling political issues, and had played a central role in monitoring the 2007 popular protests in Myanmar; coordinating widespread arrests of protesters and their interrogation. Human Rights Watch reported that as part of its interrogation process, OCMSA uses sleep deprivation and condones the beating and kicking of detainees until they are unconscious.

Notable former commanders of OCMSA include Vice President Lieutenant General (Ret.) Myint Swe, Chief of General Staff (Army, Navy and Airforce) General Mya Tun Oo and Union Minister for Home Affairs Lieutenant General Kyaw Swe.  As of September 2016, OCMSA is headed by Lieutenant General Soe Htut. Brig.-Gen Tin Oo (no relation to Gen. Tin Oo) was trained by the CIA on the Pacific island of Saipan and went on to run one of the most feared and effective military intelligence spy networks in Asia throughout the 1970s and ’80s.

Chiefs

See also

References

Military of Myanmar
Military intelligence agencies
Intel